Courtney Grosbeck is an American actress and model best known for playing the role of Coco Spectra in the soap The Bold and the Beautiful and Rachel Sachs in the series Lincoln Rhyme: Hunt for the Bone Collector.

Career 
Courtney Grosbeck in 2011 began her career as an actress in the series DayDREAMers. That same year, she played the role of Belinda Bawinkle in the film Gina and the G.I.T. (Genie-In-Training) directed by Marc C. Zatorsky. From 2012 to 2015, she played the role of Ruby Rizzoli in the series Parenthood. In 2013, she played the role of Carly in an episode of the series Modern Family.

In 2015, she played the role of Gwen Graves in the short film Call to Heroes directed by John Wynn. In the same year she covered the role of Dani in the series The Player. The following year, 2016, she played the role of Jane in the short film The Waste Land directed by Brian Brooks II.

In 2017 and 2018, she was chosen to play the role of Coco Spectra in the soap opera The Bold and the Beautiful. In 2018, she played the role of Jamie Porter in the television film Neighborhood Watch directed by Jake Helgren. That same year she played Josie Mathison-Dunn in the series Homeland.

In 2019, she played the role of Dot in the short film Then & Now directed by Niki Koss. The following year, 2020, she played the role of Rachel Sachs in the series Lincoln Rhyme: Hunt for the Bone Collector. In the same year she played the role of Young Darby in the series Love Life.

Filmography

Films

TV series

Short films

Awards and nominations

References

External links 
 
 

Living people
American actresses
American female models
21st-century American women
Year of birth missing (living people)